Harpalus torosensis is a species of ground beetle in the subfamily Harpalinae. It was described by Jedlicka in 1961.

References

torosensis
Beetles described in 1961